Flight 191 is an airline flight number that has had multiple accidents and incidents. It may refer to:

 Aeroflot Flight 191 (1963), crashed on final approach to Ashgabat International Airport, killing 12 people
 X-15 Flight 191 (1967), or X-15 Flight 3-65-97, experimental test plane, broke apart in flight, killing its test pilot
 Prinair Flight 191 (1972), crashed at Mercedita Airport in Ponce, Puerto Rico, killing five people
 American Airlines Flight 191 (1979), crashed shortly after takeoff from Chicago O'Hare Airport, killing 273
 Delta Air Lines Flight 191 (1985), crashed while on final approach to Dallas-Fort Worth, killing 137
 Comair Flight 191 (2006), crashed on take-off from the wrong runway at Lexington, Kentucky, killing 49; in all ATC communications the call sign was "Comair 191"
 JetBlue Flight 191 (2012), a flight from New York John F. Kennedy airport to Las Vegas, Nevada; diverted to Amarillo, Texas due to erratic pilot behavior

See also
Flight 901 (disambiguation)
Flight 1 / 001 (disambiguation)
Flight 101 (disambiguation)

0191